Moyosi is a genus of South American dwarf spiders that was first described by J. A. Miller in 2007.

Species
 it contains three species:
Moyosi chumota Miller, 2007 – Guyana
Moyosi prativaga (Keyserling, 1886) (type) – Brazil, Argentina
Moyosi rugosa (Millidge, 1991) – Argentina

See also
 List of Linyphiidae species (I–P)

References

Araneomorphae genera
Linyphiidae
Spiders of South America